The 2017 MIB Nordic Gorzów FIM Speedway Grand Prix of Poland was the eighth race of the 2017 Speedway Grand Prix season. It took place on August 26 at the Edward Jancarz Stadium in Gorzów, Poland.

Riders 
Second reserve Martin Smolinski replaced Greg Hancock, fourth reserve Václav Milík Jr. replaced Nicki Pedersen and fifth reserve Michael Jepsen Jensen replaced Niels-Kristian Iversen. The Speedway Grand Prix Commission also nominated Krzysztof Kasprzak as the wild card, and Kacper Woryna and Oskar Polis both as Track Reserves.

Results 
The Grand Prix was won by Great Britain's Tai Woffinden, who beat Patryk Dudek, Jason Doyle and Bartosz Zmarzlik in the final. As a result of finishing third, Doyle moved back to the top of the overall standings. Previous series leader Maciej Janowski failed to make the semi-finals.

Heat details

Intermediate classification

References

See also 
 Motorcycle speedway

Poland
Speedway Grand Prix
Grand